Anulocaulis is a small genus of flowering plants known generally as ringstems. These five species are sometimes treated as members of genus Boerhavia. Ringstems are thickly-rooted perennial wildflowers with glutinous brown bands at their stem internodes, the trait which gives them their common and Latin names. They bear tubular flowers at the tops of their stems. Ringstems are native to North America.

Species
Anulocaulis annulatus - valley ringstem
Anulocaulis eriosolenus - Big Bend ringstem
Anulocaulis gypsogenus - gypsum ringstem
Anulocaulis leiosolenus - southwestern ringstem
Anulocaulis reflexus - Texas ringstem

See also 
 Nyctaginaceae

References

External links
Jepson Manual Treatment

Nyctaginaceae
Caryophyllales genera